Maharaja Krishnakumarsinhji Bhavnagar University, formerly Bhavnagar University is a state university located in Bhavnagar city in the state of Gujarat in India. The university provides teaching and research programs in Arts, Commerce, Science, Medicine, Management, Rural Studies and Law Faculties.

107 colleges are affiliated with Bhavnagar University. University provides teaching with 22 departments, 60 Postgraduate centres, 30 Diploma course-centers and 05 recognized institutes and research centres.

Bhavnagar was the first princely state to merge with the Union of India at the time of independence in 1947 by Maharaja Raol Shri Krishnakumar Sinhji Gohil. Bhavnagar University came into being on 24 May 1979. Its land-estate area is 269 acres.

Academics
Research activities are carried out in the areas of Social Sciences, History, Nano-Technology, Marine Ecology, Intellectual Property Rights and its Management and Entrepreneurship.

The following Centres for Excellence and cells are engaged in research and consultancy services:
 Remedial Coaching Centre for S.T., S.C. and Minority
 Centre for Excellence in Nano-technology
 Gandhian Study Centre
 Ocean Science and Technology Cell for Western Coast
 ICT and ELT
 Entrepreneurship Development Cell
 Industry Linkage Cell
 Corporate Services Academy

Departments
 Department Computer Science & Applications 
 Department of Anthropology
 Department of Bioinformatics
 Department of Business Administrations 
 Department of Chemistry
 Department of Commerce
 Department of Economics
 Department of English
 Department of Geology's 
 Department of Gujarati
 Department of Hindi
 Department of History
 Department of Life Science 
 Department of Marine Science
 Department of Mathematics 
 Department of Physics
 Department of Political Science  
 Department of Psychology 
 Department of Social Work
 Department of Sociology's 
 Department of Statistics

References

External links
 

Universities in Gujarat
Education in Bhavnagar
1978 establishments in Gujarat
Educational institutions established in 1978